Innovation, Design, Entrepreneurship Academy at James W. Fannin is a personalized learning high school in Dallas, Texas and a part of the Dallas Independent School District. It occupies the former James W. Fannin Elementary School, which was built in 1915. The building was listed on the National Register of Historic Places in 1995 and as a Dallas city landmark the following year.

References

External links

 Innovation, Design, Entrepreneurship Academy at James W. Fannin
 Fannin, James W., Elementary School - National Register of Historic Places Registration Form, posted on the website of the Texas Historical Commission. Alternate link at the City of Dallas Website.
 City of Dallas
 Ordinance #22856 - Pertaining to Fannin Elementary
 Structures/Fannin Elementary School Landmark Nomination.pdf Landmark Nomination Form
 Former Fannin Elementary School attendance zones:
 2011-2012 school year, 2010-2011, 2009-2010

Dallas Independent School District
Public elementary schools in Texas
Schools in Dallas
1915 establishments in Texas
Educational institutions established in 1915